Abul Hasnat is an Indian politician from West Bengal belonging to Indian National Congress. He is a former member of the West Bengal Legislative Assembly.

Biography
Hasnat was elected as a member of the  West Bengal Legislative Assembly from Jangipur in 2001 as a Revolutionary Socialist Party candidate. He was also elected from this constituency in 2006. He joined Indian National Congress from  Revolutionary Socialist Party in 2019.

References

Living people
Indian National Congress politicians from West Bengal
West Bengal MLAs 2001–2006
West Bengal MLAs 2006–2011
People from Murshidabad district
Revolutionary Socialist Party (India) politicians
Year of birth missing (living people)